Sam Sidman (1871 – ) was an American actor. Born in the Austro-Hungarian Empire, he appeared in films such as The Daring Years (a lost film released in 1923), The Show Girl (1927), and Better Days (1927). Sidman was also a well-known comedian, imitated by Eddie Cantor for example.

At the time of his death in Pinewald, New Jersey, he was a resident of the Actors' Fund home in Englewood, New Jersey.

Selected filmography
 The Show Girl (1927)

References

External links 

1871 births
1948 deaths
American male film actors
American male silent film actors
People from Englewood, New Jersey
20th-century American male actors
Austro-Hungarian emigrants to the United States
American burlesque performers